MNI – Market News is a financial news organization focused on international capital markets. It is a provider of real-time news and analysis for the global foreign exchange market and fixed income markets. MNI has 12 bureaus across the United States, Asia, and Europe and is headquartered in London. Market News has press credentials recognized by the White House, United States Congress, the Federal Reserve, the Deutsche Bundesbank, the European Central Bank, as well as by the governments and central banks of all Group of Seven nations.

History
MNI was founded in 1983 by economist Robert Jones to advise on any pending actions by the Federal Reserve. MMS was an early innovator in the field of real-time analytics for traders. 

In December 2003, it was acquired by Xinhua Finance. In December 2008, Deutsche Börse paid $10 million to buy MNI from Xinhua. On July 5, 2016, Deutsche Börse agreed to sell MNI to Hale Global.

MNI laid off at least 17 employees shortly after the sale to Hale Global, including long time Federal Reserve reporter Steven Beckner and executive editor Tony Mace. Since then there have been two more rounds of layoffs—one in September 2017, which included Treasury reporter and one-time DC Bureau chief Denny Gulino, and one in January 2018.

In February 2017, there were allegations of plagiarism by the company's chief European correspondent and Brussels bureau chief Angelika Papamiltiadou.

In December 2017, Terry Alexander joined as CEO and Ricard Hall joined as Non-Executive Chairman.

In August 2022 MNI was acquired by Tenzing.

References

External links
 

Business newspapers published in the United Kingdom
Economics websites